Bokklubben World Library is a series of classical books, mostly novels, published by the  since 2002. It is based on a list of the hundred best books, as proposed by one hundred writers from fifty-four countries, compiled and organized in 2002 by the Book Club. This list endeavors to reflect world literature, with books from all countries, cultures, and time periods.

Each writer had to select his or her own list of ten books.  The books selected by this process and listed here are not ranked or categorized in any way; the organizers have stated that "they are all on an equal footing," with the exception of Don Quixote which was given the distinction "best literary work ever written."

Fyodor Dostoevsky is the author with the most books on the list, with four. William Shakespeare, Franz Kafka, and Leo Tolstoy each have three.

Breakdown of voters and list

The writers surveyed included 69 men and 31 women. 85 of the books included on the list are written by men, 11 are written by women, and four have unknown authors. 26 of the 100 voting writers had English as their first language, which may be a factor in the list having so many (29) books written in English.

List of books

List of authors surveyed

See also

Classic book
Larry McCaffery's list of the 20th Century's Greatest Hits: 100 English-Language Books of Fiction
[[Le Monde's 100 Books of the Century|Le Monde'''s 100 Books of the Century]]
Lists of 100 best books
List of books banned by governments
Marcel Reich-Ranicki's anthology of exemplary German literature Der Kanon
Modern Library 100 Best Novels
Modern Library 100 Best Nonfiction
Världsbiblioteket, a Swedish "100 best books" list from 1991
Western canon
World literature

References

External links
 
 
 The Guardian  The top 100 books of all time'' 
 The list's page at Greater Books, with bibliographic information for each work

Top book lists